The 1987 Spanish Grand Prix was a Formula One motor race held at Jerez on 27 September 1987. It was the thirteenth race of the 1987 Formula One World Championship. It was the 29th Spanish Grand Prix and the second to be held at Jerez.

The race was won from pole position by British driver Nigel Mansell, driving a Williams-Honda. It was Mansell's fifth victory of 1987 and the eighth for the Williams team, securing them their second consecutive Constructors' Championship and fourth in all. Frenchman Alain Prost finished second in a McLaren-TAG, some 22 seconds behind Mansell, with Swedish teammate Stefan Johansson third. Mansell's teammate and Drivers' Championship rival, Brazilian Nelson Piquet, finished fourth. Prost achieved his 55th podium finish at this race, surpassing the record of Niki Lauda.

The win moved Mansell ahead of Ayrton Senna, who finished fifth in his Lotus-Honda, into second place in the Drivers' Championship, albeit 18 points behind Piquet with three races remaining.

Summary 
Nelson Piquet secured his 24th and final F1 pole position in his Williams-Honda with Nigel Mansell completing an all-Williams front row. The race was comfortably won by Mansell who passed Piquet at the end of the first lap and was never headed. The battle for third (then second) was led for much of the time by Ayrton Senna, who like the previous year tried to complete the race without changing tyres. Both Senna and Lotus were of the opinion that the 99T's computerised active suspension system would help preserve his tyres throughout the race.

Senna had a queue of both Ferraris, Prost's McLaren and Thierry Boutsen's Benetton behind him, which was joined by Piquet after a long pit-stop. For lap after lap, Senna held off all-comers, similar to Gilles Villeneuve's performance in his Ferrari at Jarama for the 1981 Spanish Grand Prix. The Lotus-Honda was very fast in a straight line with a low downforce setup, but was slow through Jerez's many twists and turns as a result. Senna's pursuers could not pass him on the long pit straight, and with Jerez generally having a lot of dust and sand off the racing line, they were not able pass him through the corners without losing grip.

However, Piquet's similarly powered Williams was able to get by (not before having a spin) followed eventually by Boutsen and Prost as the Brazilian's tyres finally went off. Senna faded to finish fifth, but the battle for second continued between Boutsen and Piquet - Boutsen went out avoiding Piquet who was rejoining the track after having gone off - and then between Piquet and Prost, with Prost getting the better of the Williams driver who also lost third place to McLaren's Stefan Johansson who put in another strong drive. Both Ferraris blew their engines.

Martin Brundle, who finished 11th in his Zakspeed, described his drive as "the time I got out the car thinking no human could have done [any] better".

Classification

Qualifying

Race 

Numbers in brackets refer to positions of normally aspirated entrants competing for the Jim Clark Trophy.

Championship standings after the race

Drivers' Championship standings

Constructors' Championship standings

Jim Clark Trophy standings

Colin Chapman Trophy standings

References

Spanish Grand Prix
Spanish Grand Prix
Grand Prix